David or Dave Adamson may refer to:
 David B. Adamson (1823–1891), farm implement manufacturer and inventor in Adelaide, South Australia
 David R. Adamson (1923–2011), Royal Canadian Air Force officer
 Dave Adamson (Australian footballer) (1874–1914), Australian rules footballer
 Dave Adamson (English footballer) (born 1951), English footballer